William Joseph Randall (July 16, 1909 – July 7, 2000) was a member of the United States House of Representatives.  He was a member of the Democratic Party from Missouri.

Early life and early career 
Randall was born in Independence, Missouri. He attended the University of Missouri and later the Kansas City School of Law, from which he earned his Juris Doctor. Randall served as a private attorney for seven years until being drafted into the United States Army in 1943. He served in the Philippines during World War II, and he eventually reached the rank of sergeant.

Political career 
After returning home for the war, Randall was elected as a Jackson County, Missouri judge in 1946 and served until 1959. Following the death of Congressman George H. Christopher, Randall won election to the House. Randall voted in favor of the Civil Rights Acts of 1960 and 1964, and the Voting Rights Act of 1965, but voted against the Civil Rights Act of 1968.

Randall was considered a close ally of Harry Truman. He served on the Armed Services Committee and the Committee on Government Operations. In 1975, he became the first chair of the House Select Committee on Aging. In 1977, Randall retired from the House to resume the practice of law.

Death 
He died on July 7, 2000.

Sources

 December 1949 photograph of Judge Randall

References

1909 births
2000 deaths
Politicians from Independence, Missouri
University of Missouri alumni
University of Missouri–Kansas City alumni
Missouri lawyers
Democratic Party members of the United States House of Representatives from Missouri
20th-century American politicians
20th-century American lawyers